Altenmarkt im Pongau is a small town in the Austrian state of Salzburg.

Geography
Altenmarkt is situated 65 km southeast of Salzburg.

Economy
The town is principally known for its winter tourism. It is also the location of the factory manufacturing Atomic Skis.

Altenmarkt-Zauchensee is part of the Ski Amade ski area, with Zauchensee located approximately 10 km south from the town.

Personalities
Hermann Maier, former alpine skier
Michael Walchhofer, alpine skier

Image gallery

References

External links 

Altenmarkt Gemeinde (Town Council) website
Zauchensee Ferienwohnung
Therme Amade

Cities and towns in St. Johann im Pongau District
Salzburg Slate Alps
Radstadt Tauern